Nannocampus subosseus, also known as the bony-headed pipefish is a species of marine fish belonging to the family Syngnathidae. They can be found inhabiting reefs and tide pools only in the region of Shark Bay to Esperance, Western Australia. Members of this species can grow to lengths of 12 cm and their diet likely consists of small crustaceans such as copepods. Reproduction occurs through ovoviviparity in which the males brood eggs before giving live birth.

References

External links 

 Nannocampus subosseus at FishBase
 Nannocampus subosseus at Fishes of Australia

Syngnathidae
Fish described in 1870